Cavagnis is a surname. Notable people with the surname include:

Felice Cavagnis (1841–1906), Italian canon lawyer and Cardinal
Oscar Cavagnis (1974–2021), Italian cyclist

See also
Cavani